Saúl García Cabrero (born 9 November 1994), simply known as Saúl, is a Spanish professional footballer who plays as a left-back for Racing de Santander.

Football career
Born in Vioño de Piélagos, a town in the municipality of Piélagos, Cantabria. Saúl joined Racing de Santander's youth setup in 2004, aged nine, and made his senior debuts with the reserves in the 2012–13 campaign, in Segunda División B. In the 2013 summer, after both first and reserve squads' relegation, he was definitely promoted to the main squad, now in the third level.

Saúl appeared in 34 matches during the 2013–14 season, as the Cantabrian side were promoted to Segunda División at first attempt. On 24 August he played his first match as a professional, starting in a 0–1 away loss against Girona FC.

On 29 December 2014, Saúl signed a four-and-a-half-year contract with La Liga side Deportivo de La Coruña, being loaned to Racing until the end of the campaign. Roughly a year later, after being limited to only two cup matches, he was loaned to CD Tenerife until June.

On 13 August 2016, Saúl signed for Girona FC still in the second level, also in a temporary one-year deal. The following 2 January, after appearing rarely, he moved to RCD Mallorca on loan until June.

On 7 January 2018, after only one first team appearance during the first half of the 2017–18 campaign, Saúl was loaned to second tier club CD Numancia until June. He made his debut for the club three days later at the Santiago Bernabéu Stadium in the Copa del Rey against Real Madrid, providing an assist on a cross for Guillermo's second goal as Numancia drew 2–2, but were eliminated 5–2 on aggregate.

Saúl returned to Dépor for the 2018–19 campaign, being a first-choice ahead of Diego Caballo. On 27 June 2019, he agreed to a four-year contract with Deportivo Alavés in the top tier, but was loaned to second division side Rayo Vallecano on 2 September.

On 28 September 2020, Saúl joined Sporting de Gijón still in division two, on loan for one year. Upon returning to Alavés, he was assigned in the first team squad, and made his top tier debut on 25 September 2021, replacing Luis Rioja late into a 1–0 home win over Atlético Madrid.

On 29 July 2022, Saúl terminated his contract with Alavés, and returned to his first club Racing the following day, on a two-year deal.

Career statistics

Club

References

External links

1994 births
Living people
People from Gozón
Spanish footballers
Footballers from Asturias
Association football defenders
La Liga players
Segunda División players
Segunda División B players
Rayo Cantabria players
Racing de Santander players
Deportivo de La Coruña players
CD Tenerife players
Girona FC players
RCD Mallorca players
CD Numancia players
Deportivo Alavés players
Rayo Vallecano players
Sporting de Gijón players